Clayton Stevenson (born 29 December 1967) is an Australian former cyclist. He competed in the team time trial at the 1988 Summer Olympics.

References

External links
 

1967 births
Living people
Australian male cyclists
Olympic cyclists of Australia
Cyclists at the 1988 Summer Olympics
Cyclists from Sydney